Twins is the second studio album by the Singaporean duo, By2. It was released under Ocean Butterflies Music.

Track listing

References
https://web.archive.org/web/20091209064137/http://www.wayango.com/by2-twins-album/

2009 albums
By2 albums